Women started playing netball in India as early as 1926. The Sports Authority of India and the Government of India have provided much funding with the goal of improving the performance of the country's youth national team.

The Netball Federation of India was established in 1978 by Jagat Singh Chouhan from Haryana, an alumnus of YMCA College of Physical Education of Madras, and that year he organised the first national championships in Jind with great contribution of Shashi Prabha. Chouhan was founder/father of handball, netball and throwball in India. His efforts in Germany during the 1972 Munich Olympics helped in making these a legacy in India.

The national team competed in the fifth Asian Netball Championships in Colombo, Sri Lanka in 2001. Team captains included Prachi Tehlan, who captained the side that competed in the 2010 Commonwealth Games in Delhi.

Some of the important netball competitions held in India include:
 The 2010 Commonwealth Games
 The 7th Asian Youth Netball Championship, held from 3 to 10 July 2010, at the Thyagaraj Stadium.

Some of the top performances for the India national netball team include:
 2010 Nations Cup: Sixth place
 2010 Asian Youth Netball Championship: Fourth
 2011 South Asian Beach Games:  Silver medal

References

Bibliography

External links 
Olympic Council of Asia
Netball Federation of India